Matt Forde (born 6 November 1982) is an English impressionist, television writer, and radio presenter.

Background
Forde attended Becket School in West Bridgford, Nottingham. His mother is a former nun. He joined the Labour Party when he was 15 and became a member and associate of the party. Following the election of Jeremy Corbyn as Labour leader, he gave up his membership.

Career
Forde regularly broadcast with Russell Howard and Jon Richardson on their shows on BBC Radio 6 (2007–2010). Forde has made six seasons of Unspun with Matt Forde, a topical political show on Dave. In August 2018, Forde became host of Absolute Radio's Rock 'N' Roll Football with fellow Nottingham Forest fan Matt Dyson. On Spitting Image, Forde voices  Donald Trump, Boris Johnson, and Keir Starmer.

Forde wrote the memoir Politically Homeless, published by Quercus Books in 2020.

Forde co-hosts the Wondery podcast British Scandal with Alice Levine, and also hosts The Political Party.

In 2022, Forde held a live comedy tour titled "Clowns to the Left of Me, Jokers to the Right."

References

External links
Official website 
 "TalkSport's Matt Forde and the best radio rant, ever" The Guardian  13 September 2011.
Rock 'N' Roll Football on Absolute Radio

1982 births
Living people
People from Nottingham
British radio DJs
English male comedians